Cyprus International University (CIU) is an English-language private university in Northern Cyprus. It is located in the capital, North Nicosia and was established in 1997.

History 
Cyprus International University was established in 1997, as a result of rising interest in higher educational institutions and instruction in English, and in recognition of the increased need for universities which conduct education in foreign languages in Cyprus and other countries in the region.

Campus 

Cyprus International University is in North Nicosia, the capital of Northern Cyprus; the university is situated 5 km from the city centre, 14 km from the Ercan State Airport, 50 km from the town of Famagusta, and 30 km from the coastal town of Kyrenia.

For Applications to the university students usually use *RocApply platform

Organization

Faculties 

 Faculty of Medicine
 Medicine

 Faculty of Dentistry
 Dentistry

 Faculty of Pharmacy 
 Pharmacy

 Faculty of Education 
 Computer and Instructional Technology Teacher Education
 English Language Teaching
 The Pre-School Teacher Education
 and Psychological Counselling
 Arts Education and Crafts Teaching
 Classroom Teaching
 Turkish Language Teaching
 Mentally Handicapped Teaching

 Faculty of Arts and Sciences 
 Psychology
 Turkish Language and Literature

 Faculty of Fine Arts 
 Industrial Product Design
 Graphic Design
 Interior Design
 Architecture

 Faculty of Law 
 Law

 Faculty of Economics and Administrative Sciences 
 European Union Relations
 Business Administration
 Social Work
 International Relations

 Faculty of Communication 
 Journalism
 Visual Communication Design
 Radio and Television
 Advertising and Public Relations

 Faculty of Engineering 
 Computer Engineering.
 Informations System Engineering
 Bioengineering
 Environmental Engineering
 Electric and Electronics Engineering
 Industrial Engineering
 Engineering Management 
 Energy Systems Engineering
 Civil Engineering
 Mechanical Engineering

 Faculty of Health Sciences 
 Physical Therapy and Rehabilitation
 Nutrition and Dietetics

 Faculty of Agricultural Sciences and Technologies 
 Biosystems Engineering
 Plant Production and Technologies

Institutes 
 Master Programs
 PhD Programs

Schools 
 The School of Justice
 Vocational School
 Vocational School of Health Services
 Tourism and Hotel Management
 School of Applied Sciences
 School of Foreign Languages

Academic profile

Research 
Cyprus International University is home to the following research centers:
 Center of Environmental Research
 Center of Cyprus Studies
 Center for Social and Strategic Policy Research (CIU CSSPR)
 CIU Center for Underwater Archeology and Imaging
 Center for Cultural Heritage Research
 Biotechnology Research Center
 Communication Technologies Research Center
 The Cyprus Bee and Bee Products Research Center
 The Center for Applied Research in Business Economics and Technology
 Cyprus and Mediterranean Studies Center
 Women And Gender Studies Research Center
 Women And Gender Studies Research Center

Continuing Education Center 
The Continuing Education Center in CIU, is the unit that maintains the arrangement, coordination and execution of education programs which are prepared to be served to society.

Library 

The CIU Library provides opportunities for students, academic, and administrative staff to benefit from library services by joining for free. There is a huge collection which consists of books, e-books, journals, magazines, CDs, video tapes, floppy disks, and academic internet sources in the library.

CIU FM 107.2 
CIU FM gives the opportunity to the Communication Faculty students to practice; especially in radio programming, broadcasting and radio station management. CIU FM, which provides communication and knowledge exchange between university directory and students, is not only a station that broadcasts music but it also provides cultural knowledge flow to the listeners, and an enjoyable gathering point where social benefits and education are considered. CIU FM aims to be the pioneer station, according to the listening statistics, in the Northern Cyprus.

Affiliations 
Cyprus International University is a full member of institutions and organizations such as;

 North Cyprus Higher Education Planning, Evaluation, Accreditation and Coordination Council (YÖDAK)
 Turkish Republic Council of Higher Education (YÖK)
 International Association of Universities (IAU)
 European Consortium for Political Research (ECPR)
 European Association for International Education (EAIE)
 Association of International Educators (NAFSA)
 World Association of Universities and Colleges (WAUC)
 Federation of the Universities of the Islamic World (FUIW)
 European Council for Business Education (ECBE)
 Council on Hotel, Restaurant and Institutional Educational (CHRIE)
 International Society for Engineering Education (IGIP)
 National Recognation Information Centre for The United Kingdom (UK NARIC)
 Association for Evaluation and Accreditation of Engineering Programs (MÜDEK)

Student life 

CIU's student body represents over 64 different countries, and there are a number of student clubs catering to the interests of students outside of pure academy.

CIU Arena 
CIU Arena which is the first integrated sport complex and also the largest sporting facility in TRNC consists of 7500 m2 indoor and 15.000 m2 outdoor area. The complex which has the capacity of 1710 spectators, consists of a professional and inclusive fitness room, indoor sport hall (1540 capacity), indoor swimming pool (semi- Olympic, 170 capacity), table-tennis, aerobic gall, wall bars, shooting circle, squash, club rooms, cafe, health centre, changing rooms, offices, classrooms etc.

References

External links 
 Cyprus International University website

English as a global language
Universities in Northern Cyprus
Universities and colleges in Cyprus
Education in Nicosia
1997 establishments in Northern Cyprus